Emily Foster Stone is an American mathematician whose research includes work in fluid dynamics and dynamical systems. She is a professor of mathematics at the University of Montana, where she chairs the Department of Mathematical Sciences. She is also chair of the Activity Group on Dynamical Systems of the Society for Industrial and Applied Mathematics.

Education
Stone majored in physics at the University of California, Santa Cruz, graduating in 1984. She completed her Ph.D. in theoretical and applied mechanics at Cornell University in 1989; her dissertation, A Study of Low-Dimensional Models for the Wall Region of a Turbulent Boundary Layer, was supervised by Philip Holmes.

Career
Stone taught at Arizona State University from 1992 to 1993, and at Utah State University from 1993 to 2004, before joining the University of Montana faculty in 2004.

Service
Stone was elected as chair of the Activity Group on Dynamical Systems (SIAG-DS) of the Society for Industrial and Applied Mathematics (SIAM) in 2020. She was elected Vice Chair of the same SIAG in 2022.

Selected publications

References

Year of birth missing (living people)
Living people
20th-century American mathematicians
21st-century American mathematicians
American women mathematicians
University of California, Santa Cruz alumni
Cornell University alumni
Arizona State University faculty
Utah State University faculty
University of Montana faculty
20th-century American women
21st-century American women